Tridensimilis is a genus of pencil catfishes native to South America.

Species
There are currently two recognized species in this genus:
 Tridensimilis brevis (Eigenmann & Eigenmann, 1889)
 Tridensimilis venezuelae Schultz, 1944

Tridensimilis brevis is distributed in the Amazon River basin in Brazil, while T. venezuelae is distributed in the Orinoco basin in Venezuela. Both species grow to about 2.5–3.0 centimetres (.98–1.2 in) TL. T. brevis lives in the sand of shallow rivers and creeks. It is parasitic, entering the gill chambers of larger catfishes. It is also known for entering, probably by mistake, the urethra of mammals urinating under water.

References

Trichomycteridae
Fish of South America
Fish of Brazil
Fish of Venezuela
Taxa named by Leonard Peter Schultz
Catfish genera
Freshwater fish genera